Roarin' Broncs is a 1927 American silent Western film directed by Richard Thorpe and starring Jay Wilsey, Ann McKay and Harry Todd.

Plot 
U.S. Border Patrol agent Bill Morris investigates the Tracy and Ball Ranch about an operation smuggling Chinese immigrants across the Mexico–United States border. Morris discovers the rancher's son Henry Ball to be responsible but gets captured by the gang after a motorcycle chase. Morris escapes from a shack, captures a tractor, and apprehends the gang.

Cast
 Jay Wilsey as Bill Morris 
 Ann McKay as Rose Tracy 
 Harry Todd
 Lafe McKee
 George Magrill as Henry Ball

References

Bibliography
 Langman, Larry. A Guide to Silent Westerns. Greenwood Publishing Group, 1992.

External links
 

1927 films
1927 Western (genre) films
1920s English-language films
American black-and-white films
Pathé Exchange films
Films directed by Richard Thorpe
Silent American Western (genre) films
Films about illegal immigration to the United States
1920s American films